

J02A Antimycotics for systemic use

J02AA Antibiotics
J02AA01 Amphotericin B
J02AA02 Hachimycin

J02AB Imidazole derivatives
J02AB01 Miconazole
J02AB02 Ketoconazole
QJ02AB90 Clotrimazole

J02AC Triazole and tetrazole derivatives
J02AC01 Fluconazole
J02AC02 Itraconazole
J02AC03 Voriconazole
J02AC04 Posaconazole
J02AC05 Isavuconazole
J02AC06 Oteseconazole

J02AX Other antimycotics for systemic use
J02AX01 Flucytosine
J02AX04 Caspofungin
J02AX05 Micafungin
J02AX06 Anidulafungin 
J02AX07 Ibrexafungerp
J02AX08 Rezafungin acetate

References

J02